Jordan's damsel (Teixeirichthys jordani) is a species of ray-finned fish from the family Pomacentridae, the damselfishes and clownfishes, it is the only species in the monotypic genus Teixeirichthys. It has a disjunct distribution in the Indian and western pacific Oceans having been recorded from the Red Sea, Mozambique Channel, Seychelles, Taiwan, Hong Kong, China and Japan. It is found in beds of sea grass and over sandy substrates. Jordan's damsel is frequently observed to form mid-water aggregations of as many as several hundreds of individuals. It has been recorded using small rocky outcrops and areas of debris to nest in in the Gulf of Aqaba. The generic name honours Gabriel M. Teixeira (1897-1973), who was the Governor-General of Mozambique and who assisted J.L.B. Smith's studies of the fish fauna of that territory. The specific name and common name both honour the American ichthyologist David Starr Jordan (1851-1931) who gave a collection of specimens from Swatow to Rutter, among which was the type of this species.

References

External links
 

Pomacentrinae
Fish of the Indian Ocean
Fish of the Pacific Ocean
Fish described in 1897
Taxa named by Cloudsley Louis Rutter